Chenjia (Chinese: t , s , p Chénjiā,  "[home of] the Chen family") may refer to the following places in China:

Towns
The following towns may also be known as Chenjiazhen (t , s , p Chénjiā Zhèn):
 Chenjia, Shanghai, on Chongming Island
 Chenjia, Sichuan, in Zizhong County

Townships
The following townships may also be known as Chenjiaxiang (t , s , p Chénjiā Xiāng):
 Chenjia, Liaoning, in Panshan County